Mall Ciputra (formerly Citraland Mall, abbreviated CL) is a mall in Grogol Petamburan, West Jakarta, Indonesia. It was opened in February 1993.

In addition to branded shops, restaurants, and a department store, there is a supermarket, a cinema, a bookstore, a hotel, and a children's playground. The mall has an open design which allows shoppes on all levels to view the center court.

In 2012, the mall experienced a major renovation.

See also
 List of malls in Jakarta

Notes and references

External links

Ciputra Mall Jakarta

Shopping malls in Jakarta
1993 establishments in Indonesia
West Jakarta